Loreto is a smalI municipality in the Beni Department in northern Bolivia, capital of the Marbán Province and Loreto Municipality. In 2001, Loreto had a population of 843.

History
Loreto was the first of the Jesuit Missions of Moxo to be founded. Loreto Mission was founded in 1682.

Languages
Camba Spanish is the primary vernacular lingua franca spoken in the town. Loretano, a Moxo dialect, is the main indigenous language spoken.

References

External links
Satellite map at Maplandia.com

Populated places in Beni Department
Jesuit Missions of Moxos